Mikesville is an unincorporated community in Columbia County, Florida, United States.

Notes

Unincorporated communities in Columbia County, Florida
Unincorporated communities in Florida